Samel Šabanović (born 23 December 1983) is a Montenegrin footballer who plays for Liechtenstein club Eschen-Mauren in the Swiss 1. Liga.

Club career
Šabanović has played for several clubs in Germany and Switzerland as well as on loan for Esbjerg fB in Denmark. He was signed for FC Wil from FC Kreuzlingen of 1. Liga on 28 January 2006. At the start of 2007–08 season, he scored 4 goals in a match against FC Chiasso on 4 August 2007. Which the match end at 5–2 win.

In 2019, he left Brühl after scoring 85 goals in 189 games for them and joined Young Fellows Juventus. He moved on to USV Eschen/Mauren in August 2020.

References

External links
 

1983 births
Living people
People from Bijelo Polje
Association football forwards
Serbia and Montenegro footballers
Montenegrin footballers
Kickers Offenbach players
FC Kreuzlingen players
FC Wil players
Grasshopper Club Zürich players
Esbjerg fB players
FC Aarau players
SC Brühl players
FC Köniz players
SC Young Fellows Juventus players
USV Eschen/Mauren players
Regionalliga players
Swiss Challenge League players
Swiss Super League players
Danish Superliga players
Swiss Promotion League players
Swiss 1. Liga (football) players
Serbia and Montenegro expatriate footballers
Expatriate footballers in Germany
Serbia and Montenegro expatriate sportspeople in Germany
Montenegrin expatriate footballers
Expatriate footballers in Switzerland
Montenegrin expatriate sportspeople in Switzerland
Expatriate men's footballers in Denmark
Montenegrin expatriate sportspeople in Denmark
Expatriate footballers in Liechtenstein